Singapore Pinacothèque de Paris was a private art museum formerly located in the Fort Canning Arts Centre at Fort Canning Park, Singapore. It opened to the public on 30 May 2015 and had its last day of operations on 10 April 2016, citing "weaker than expected visitorship and other business and financial challenges faced".

The museum in Singapore was the first international offshoot of Pinacothèque de Paris, a private museum in Paris which opened in 2007 and closed in February 2016 after going into receivership in November 2015.

Background
The project was a joint initiative between Marc Restellini, Yves Bouvier, Alain Vandenborre and KOP Properties.

Renovation of Fort Canning Centre
From 2014 to 2015, Fort Canning Centre was completely renovated and reopened as Fort Canning Arts Centre to host Singapore Pinacothèque de Paris and several shops and restaurants, some of which remain in operation after the closure of the museum. The project was partially funded by the Singapore Tourism Board and had a budget of US$24 million.

Exhibitions
2015
Inauguration of the Permanent Collection and Heritage Gallery.
The Myth of Cleopatra.

2016
Pressionism: Graffiti Masterpieces on Canvas.

Controversies and closure
The museum was subject to some controversy because of its lack of visitors, which had placed a number of the commercial tenants of Fort Canning Centre in financial difficulties. In addition, one of the investors in the project, Yves Bouvier, has been accused by a Russian collector of selling to him artworks which were stolen or greatly overpriced, claims which Bouvier denies.

The museum closed on 10 April 2016. The company which managed the museum, Art Heritage Singapore, faced a lawsuit in Singapore initiated by an Italian exhibition organiser over a sum of about €435,000 as the closure occurred.

References

External links
 

2015 establishments in Singapore
2016 disestablishments in Singapore
Art museums disestablished in 2016
Art museums established in 2015
Museum Planning Area
Museums in Singapore
Defunct art museums and galleries